Platou may refer to:

Carl Nicolai Stoud Platou (1809–1888), Norwegian civil servant and politician
Carl Platou (1885–1956), Norwegian civil servant and politician
Christian Emil Stoud Platou (1861–1923), Norwegian railroad director and politician for the Conservative Party
Erling Platou (1896–1958), American pediatrician at the University of Minnesota Medical Center
F. S. Platou (1903–1980), Norwegian architect
Frederik Christian Stoud Platou (1811–1891), Norwegian legal scholar, Supreme Court justice, district stipendiary magistrate and politician
Gabriel Andreas Stoud Platou (1858–1911), Norwegian banker and politician for the Conservative Party
Harald Platou (1877–1946), Norwegian lawyer and fencer
Karen Platou (1879–1950), Norwegian businesswoman and a politician for the Conservative Party
Lars Hannibal Sommerfeldt Stoud Platou (1848–1923), Norwegian psychiatrist
Lars T. Platou (1920–2003), Norwegian electrical engineer and politician for the Conservative Party
Ludvig Stoud Platou (1778–1833), Danish-Norwegian educator, historical and geographical writer, politician and State Secretary
Oscar Ludvig Stoud Platou (1845–1929), Norwegian jurist
Ragnar Stoud Platou (1897–1979), Norwegian ship broker
Theodor Platou (1892–1969), Norwegian businessperson in the brewery industry
Valborg Stoud Platou (1881–1960), Norwegian judge and attorney
Waldemar Stoud Platou (1868–1930), Norwegian businessperson
Peter Platou Stabell (1908–1992), Norwegian barrister
Anders Platou Wyller (1903–1940), Norwegian philologist and humanist

See also
Plat
Plato
Platyomus